Kykuit, known also as the John D. Rockefeller Estate, is a 40-room historic house museum in Pocantico Hills, a hamlet in the town of Mount Pleasant, New York 25 miles north of New York City. The house was built for oil tycoon and Rockefeller family patriarch John D. Rockefeller. Conceived largely by his son, John D. Rockefeller Jr., and enriched by the art collection of the third-generation scion, Governor of New York, and Vice President of the United States, Nelson Rockefeller, it was home to four generations of the family. The house is a National Historic Landmark owned by the National Trust for Historic Preservation, and tours are given by Historic Hudson Valley.

Kykuit (in modern Dutch the word Kijkuit means "Lookout", from kijkuit (also uitkijk), both compound nouns meaning "lookout, look-out") is situated on the highest point in Pocantico Hills, overlooking the Hudson River at Tappan Zee. Located near Tarrytown and Sleepy Hollow, it has a view of the New York City skyline 25 miles to the south.

History
John D. Rockefeller purchased land in the area as early as 1893, after his brother William had moved into a 204-room mansion, Rockwood Hall, nearby. When Rockefeller and his son chose Pocantico Hills as their residence, he quietly purchased multiple homes and properties in the area, and used the houses for himself, his family, staff, or to rent out. Rockefeller and his wife Laura Spelman Rockefeller moved into one of these, the Parsons-Wentworth House, in 1893. The couple would spend winter weekends and parts of each summer and fall there, sharing the upstairs rooms with their adult children and in-laws, pending construction of the manor house.

The Parsons-Wentworth House burned down on September 17, 1902, and the Kent House became their temporary residence until rebuilding could occur. The New York Times mentioned that Rockefeller had never been satisfied with the destroyed house's electric wiring, which had been installed before certain safety measures were developed. He had ordered workers to reroute the wires into conduits, work which had been planned to commence the day after it was pre-empted by the fire. The loss was estimated at $40,000.

Kykuit was designed originally as a steep-roofed three-story stone mansion by the architects Chester Holmes Aldrich and William Adams Delano. Aldrich was a distant relative of the younger Rockefeller's wife, Abby Aldrich Rockefeller, who was involved as artistic consultant and in the interior design of the mansion.

The initial eclectic structure took six years to complete. Before being occupied, it was substantially rebuilt into its present four-story Classical Revival Georgian form. Completed in 1913, it has two basement levels filled with interconnecting passageways and service tunnels. The home's interiors were designed by Ogden Codman Jr., and feature collections of Chinese and European ceramics, fine furnishings, and 20th-century art.

The estate was designated a National Historic Landmark in 1976. In 1979, its occupant, Nelson Rockefeller, bequeathed upon his death his one-third interest in the estate to the National Trust for Historic Preservation. Today, Kykuit is open to the public for tours conducted by Historic Hudson Valley.

Kykuit was renovated and modernized in 1995 by New Haven architect Herbert S. Newman and Partners. Included were major infrastructure changes enabling the estate to accommodate group tours of the first floor and art gallery, as well as a reconfiguration of third and fourth floor staff quarters into guest suites.

Gardens 

Initially, landscaping of the grounds was given to the firm of Frederick Law Olmsted, who had designed Manhattan's Central Park.  Rockefeller Senior was unhappy with this work however and assumed control of the design himself, transplanting whole mature trees, designing lookouts and the several scenic winding roads. In 1906, the further design of Kykuit's grounds was undertaken by the architect William Welles Bosworth, who designed the surrounding terraces and gardens with fountains, pavilions and classical sculpture. These gardens in the Beaux-Arts style are considered some of Bosworth's best work in the United States, looking out over very fine views of the Hudson River. A few years later, Bosworth would design the Neo-Classical main building complex and landscaping for the new campus of the Massachusetts Institute of Technology in Cambridge, Massachusetts.

Bosworth's original gardens still exist, with plantings carefully replaced over time, although his entrance forecourt was extended in 1913. The terraced gardens include a Morning Garden, Grand Staircase, Japanese Garden, Italian Garden, Japanese-style brook, Japanese Tea-house, large Oceanus fountain, Temple of Aphrodite, loggia, and semicircular rose garden.

Art collection
Distributed through the estate are numerous artworks reflecting the tastes of the past occupants. Governor Nelson Rockefeller collected and displayed many 20th century artworks, with a focus on abstract works from the 1950s through the 1970s. He was also very influential in the selection of artworks for the Governor Nelson A. Rockefeller Empire State Plaza Art Collection, located next to the New York State Capitol in Albany, New York.

Nelson Rockefeller transformed previously empty basement passages beneath the mansion that had led to a grotto into a major private art gallery containing paintings by Picasso, Chagall, and Warhol, the latter two having visited the estate. Between 1935 and the late 1970s more than 120 works of abstract, avant-garde, and modern sculpture from Nelson's collection were added to the gardens and grounds, including works by Pablo Picasso (Bathers), Constantin Brâncuși, Karel Appel (Mouse on Table), Jean Arp, Alexander Calder, Alberto Giacometti, Georg Kolbe (Ruf der Erde), Gaston Lachaise, Aristide Maillol, Henry Moore, Louise Nevelson, Isamu Noguchi (Black Sun), and David Smith.

Public tours
The inner park area was opened to restricted conducted tours of the mansion and immediate surrounds in 1994, but remains occupied and controlled by the family by the Rockefeller Brothers Fund, which leased the area from the National Trust for Historic Preservation in 1991 and serves as steward of what is referred to as "the historic area".

Public tours are conducted by Historic Hudson Valley, an organization established in 1951 by John D. Rockefeller Jr. "to celebrate the region's history, architecture, landscape, and material culture, advancing its importance and thereby assuring its preservation."  Shuttle vans run from a visitor center located at the Philipsburg Manor House on Route 9 in Sleepy Hollow, New York.

Pocantico, the family estate

During much of the 20th century, the  estate featured a resident workforce of security guards, gardeners, and laborers, and had its own farming, cattle, and food supplies. It has a nine-hole, reversible golf course, and at one time had 75 houses and 70 private roads, most designed by John D. Rockefeller Sr. and his son. A longstanding witticism about the estate quips: "It's what God would have built, if only He had the money".

In 1901, John D. Rockefeller Sr. hired golf course architect Willie Dunn, the designer of Shinnecock Hills Golf Club, to build a golf course on the grounds.

In late 1946, two of Junior's sons, John D. Rockefeller III and Laurance Rockefeller, each offered their respective residences, Rockwood Hall and Fieldwood Farm, as headquarters for the then newly formed United Nations. Family patriarch Rockefeller Junior vetoed the proposals, as the sites were too isolated from Manhattan. He instead tasked his second son, Nelson, to buy a  site along the East River in New York City, which was subsequently donated for the construction of the UN Headquarters.

Among guests hosted by Nelson and his brother David have been American Presidents Lyndon B. Johnson, Richard M. Nixon, Gerald Ford, and Ronald Reagan, and their wives. Other notable visitors have included United Nations Secretary-General Kofi Annan, President of the Republic of South Africa Nelson Mandela, Shah of Iran Mohammad Reza Pahlavi, King Hussein of Jordan, President Anwar Sadat of Egypt, and Lord Mountbatten of Burma of the United Kingdom.

, 10 or so Rockefeller families lived within the estate, in the central compound and beyond. Much land has been donated over the decades to New York State, including the Rockefeller State Park Preserve, and is open to the public for horseback riding, biking, and jogging. Bill Clinton, who lives just north of the estate, in Chappaqua, has taken regular runs in the State Park.

Residences
Within the park:

 "Hawes House", home of Nelson Rockefeller
 "Kent House", home of Laurance Rockefeller

Outside the park:

 "Abeyton Lodge", home of John D. Rockefeller Jr., demolished when he occupied Kykuit after his father's death.
 "Fieldwood Farm", home of John D. Rockefeller III.
 "Hillcrest", a Rockefeller University property, formerly the mansion built for Martha Baird Rockefeller, second wife of John D. Rockefeller Jr., and current location of the 3-story underground bunker housing the Rockefeller Archive Center
 "Hudson Pines", home of David Rockefeller, just north of the Park, originally built for and occupied by his only sister, Abby
 "Hunting Lodge", second home of Nelson
 "Rockwood Hall", originally the  property of John D. Rockefeller Sr.'s, brother William Rockefeller. It is currently part of the Rockefeller State Park Preserve.

Notable outbuildings

 The Pocantico Conference Center of the Rockefeller Brothers Fund (RBF), in the Park, where there are regular conferences.

 Originally the "Coach Barn", a three-story complex ultimately redesigned and completed during 1913–14, in heavy stone from the local area, it was the first new structure built on the estate. It is three times the size of the Kykuit mansion. It still houses an impressive collection of horse-drawn carriages, and an equally noteworthy collection of 12 family-owned vintage cars for public viewing, graphically illustrating the development of automotive design from the early to the mid-twentieth century.

In 1994, with funding from David Rockefeller and brother Laurance, its lower floor was converted by the New Haven architects Herbert S. Newman and Partners into a modern, fully equipped meeting facility for the Fund's conferences, with limited overnight accommodations on the upper floor. The facilities, furthering the projects and objectives of the RBF through conferences, seminars, workshops and retreats for RBF staff, are also available to both domestic and foreign nonprofit organizations, including annual gatherings of all the major foundation presidents and UN Security Council officials, among numerous other dignitaries.
    
 The "Playhouse", the family seat. In the park, this is the location, since 1994, of the regular semi-annual family meetings, in June and December.

A rambling French Norman two-story structure completed by Junior during 1927, this structure is also three times the size of the Kykuit mansion. Standing alongside the nine-hole, reversible golf course, an outdoor swimming pool and two tennis courts, it contains an indoor swimming pool and tennis court, fully equipped basketball gym, squash court, billiard room and full-size bowling alley. It also has dining and living rooms, and a huge reception room resembling an English baronial hall.

 The Orangerie, housing citrus plants, this is modeled after the original at the Palace of Versailles
 Breuer Guest House, a modern house that was exhibited at the Museum of Modern Art, then disassembled, shipped to, and reassembled at the estate.
 Underground Bomb Shelter, the location of cabinet papers and private telephone transcripts delivered to the estate during 1973 - and kept there for an unknown period of time - by the then Secretary of State, Henry Kissinger.
 The Stone Barns Center for Food & Agriculture, outside the park, this was opened by David Rockefeller and Peggy Dulany during 2004  and was established in memory of Rockefeller's wife, Peggy. It sells organic local produce, meat, and eggs to the nearby public for-profit restaurant, Blue Hill, as well as to local businesses in the Pocantico Hills area.
 The Rockefeller Archive Center, a voluminous three-story underground bunker built below the foundations of the Hillcrest mansion of Martha Baird Rockefeller, situated just outside the Park area. This is an impressively equipped repository of 150-plus years of Rockefeller papers, memorabilia, and other outside organizations' collections. It is staffed by ten full-time archivists who patrol  -long shelves on rails, and it contains, for researchers, the publicly restricted and expurgated family history.

Additionally, family members have had a profound effect on the hamlet of Pocantico Hills, which is situated in the open space of the estate completely surrounded by family-owned land. The Union Church of Pocantico Hills, now owned by Historic Hudson Valley, was built by the Rockefeller family, which commissioned stained-glass windows by Matisse (an abstract rose window, memorializing Abby Aldrich) and by Chagall (the remainder of the windows, emphasizing Biblical prophets and some New Testament themes, and memorializing various members of the family and others).  They also helped finance the construction of the local Pocantico Hills School.

See also
List of National Historic Landmarks in New York
National Register of Historic Places listings in northern Westchester County, New York

References

Further reading
The House the Rockefellers Built: A Tale of Money, Taste, and Power in the Twentieth-Century America, Robert F. Dalzell and Lee Baldwin Dalzell, New York: Henry Holt and Co., 2007.

Abby Aldrich Rockefeller: The Woman in the Family. Bernice Kert, New York: Random House, 1993.
Pocantico: Fifty Years on the Rockefeller Domain, Tom Pyle, as told to Beth Day, New York: Duell, Sloan and Pierce, 1964.
Titan: The Life of John D. Rockefeller, Sr., Ron Chernow, London: Warner Books, 1998.
Memoirs, David Rockefeller, New York: Random House, 2002.
The Rockefeller Century: Three Generations of America's Greatest Family, John Ensor Harr and Peter J. Johnson. New York: Charles Scribner's Sons, 1988.
Great Houses of the Hudson River, Michael Middleton Dwyer, editor, with preface by Mark Rockefeller, Boston, MA: Little, Brown and Company, published in association with Historic Hudson Valley, 2001. .

External links

 Official website
 HABS: 12 photos, 6 maps and drawings, 23 data pages on Kykuit at the Historic American Buildings Survey
 Rockefeller Brothers Fund official website—Details the regular conferences held by the Fund at the Pocantico estate.
 Rockefeller Archive Center—A division of Rockefeller University, these family archives are located outside the Park area in the estate.
 "Life at Pocantico Then and Now" A 2002 New York Times interview with David Rockefeller on growing up on the estate.
 "Spending a Day at the Rockefellers" February 2007 NYT article profiling the family estate.
 "The Estate Next Door" 2003 NYT article giving a brief overview of the estate.
 "Development: Rockefeller Kin to Save Land" 2003 NYT article on David Rockefeller's plans for the organic Stone Barns complex and a niece's intervention regarding a housing development on the estate.
 Architect's Website: Restoration of the Coach Barn
 Welles Bosworth: The Altoviti Aphrodite. Printed 1920.

1913 establishments in New York (state)
Art museums and galleries in New York (state)
Biographical museums in New York (state)
Colonial Revival architecture in New York (state)
Delano & Aldrich buildings
Gardens in New York (state)
Historic house museums in Westchester County, New York
Houses completed in 1913
Houses on the National Register of Historic Places in New York (state)
Landscape design history of the United States
Pocantico Hills, New York
Museums in Westchester County, New York
National Historic Landmarks in New York (state)
National Register of Historic Places in Westchester County, New York
National Trust for Historic Preservation
Open-air museums in New York (state)
Rockefeller family residences
Sculpture gardens, trails and parks in New York (state)
U.S. Route 9
Gilded Age mansions